1979 Japanese Super Cup was the Japanese Super Cup competition. The match was played at National Stadium in Tokyo on April 8, 1979. Mitsubishi Motors won the championship.

Match details

References

Japanese Super Cup
1979 in Japanese football
Urawa Red Diamonds matches
Sanfrecce Hiroshima matches